Charles Allen Warner (born April 14, 1940) is a former  defensive back who played collegiate football for the Prairie View Panthers and Professional Football in the American Football League. He played for the Kansas City Chiefs and Buffalo Bills. He joined the Bills in 1964 and was part of the defensive team that compiled a string of seventeen consecutive games without allowing a rushing touchdown by an opponent, a Professional Football record that helped the team to consecutive AFL championships in 1964 and 1965.  Warner had 5 interceptions in the 1965 season, helping the Bills achieve a league-leading 37 'picks'.

See also
Other American Football League players

External links
 1964 American Football League Champions
 1965 American Football League Champions

References

1940 births
Living people
American football defensive backs
American Football League All-Star players
American Football League players
Buffalo Bills players
Kansas City Chiefs players
People from Granger, Texas
Prairie View A&M Panthers football players